James Thomas Wardlaw Birchall (born 23 November 1962) is an Australian cricketer. He played three first-class matches for South Australia in 1986/87.

See also
 List of South Australian representative cricketers

References

External links
 

1962 births
Living people
Australian cricketers
South Australia cricketers
Cricketers from Adelaide